Operation Fox Hunt is a Chinese covert global operation whose purported aim is anti-corruption under Chinese Communist Party general secretary Xi Jinping's administration. It has led to the arrest of over 40 of its 100 most wanted globally. The program has been accused of targeting Chinese dissidents living abroad to stop their activism under the guise of returning corrupt Chinese nationals to China to face criminal charges.

History

Operation Fox Hunt was launched in June 2014. In the course of six months during 2015 Operation Fox Hunt repatriated 680 people to China.

In 2015 Operation Fox Hunt scored its first big success in Europe with the arrest and extradition of a woman surnamed Zhang from Italy. It was the first time a European country had extradited someone to China on accusations of financial crimes.

In March 2017, Ningxia investigators and Paris embassy personnel “successfully persuaded” fugitive Zheng Ning to come home, after he had lived in France for three years before his mysterious disappearance. Despite an extradition treaty between France and China, French officials were not informed of the repatriation, leading French intelligence to lodge a complaint. Paul Charon, an expert on China at the French defense ministry's Institute for Strategic Research, says “It also shows a bigger phenomenon: the hardening stance of the regime in Beijing, which dares to carry out these operations overseas and mock the sovereignty of other countries.”

The Canadian Security Intelligence Service (CSIS) publicly acknowledged to The Globe and Mail that China is using threats and intimidation against members of Canada's Chinese community that are akin to the tactics used in Operation Fox Hunt. CSIS said that “these tactics can also be used as cover for silencing dissent, pressuring political opponents and instilling a general fear of state power no matter where a person is located.”

According to Freedom House, the Chinese intelligence and state security apparatus consisting of the People's Liberation Army (PLA), the Ministry of Public Security (MPS) and the Ministry of State Security (MSS) are thought to play key roles in the coordination of Fox Hunt. The MPS is China's national police and domestic counter-intelligence agency responsible for law enforcement and the MSS is responsible for foreign and counter-intelligence. The MPS is alleged to handle the re-patriation of corruption suspects to Chinese territory while the MSS is thought to be responsible for targeting and handling political dissidents abroad with the PLA playing a role in cyberwarfare and spyware campaigns targeted at dissidents abroad.

Operation Skynet 

Announced in 2015, Operation Skynet is a parallel and simultaneous program designed to augment operation Fox Hunt by restricting the financial flows of cadres which have fled overseas and by engaging in recovery of corrupt proceeds. South China Morning Post reports that program will "go further" than previous manhunts through the coordination of multiple government agencies to cut off the exfiltration of state and corrupt assets abroad.

Use of exit-bans 
The Chinese Communist Party under Xi Jinping has pursued a policy of exit-bans against dissidents, political activists as well as family members of relatives and corruption suspects who have fled abroad, the rationale being to coerce fugitives who have fled overseas to return to China to face prosecution. Family members of suspects accused of corruption by Chinese authorities, particularly Chinese American citizens and other overseas Chinese nationals are frequently stopped at airports without explanation and informed by China Immigration Inspection personnel that they are barred from leaving due to a member of their family being wanted on corruption, embezzlement or other charges.

In August 2017, the son and wife in law of allegedly corrupt official Xu Weiming: Daniel Hsu and Jodie Chen were prevented from exiting China, forcing their 16-year-old daughter to return to the United States alone. In April 2019, Chen's exit ban was lifted after writing a petition to Chinese authorities pleading to convince her father-in-law to return to the United States. Chinese authorities lifted the exit ban allowing Chen to return to the United States, however Hsu remained under detention within China. In November 2021, Hsu's exit ban was lifted and he was allowed to return home to the United States.

In November 2018, two Chinese American citizens Victor and Cynthia Liu were stopped by China Immigration Inspection and prevented from leaving the country. Chinese authorities alleged that their father and former official at the state owned Bank of Communications, Liu Changming was wanted for embezzlement charges. The pairs' mother and naturalized American citizen Sandra Han was also detained allegedly in a black jail by Chinese public security authorities. In September 2021, reporting by the South China Morning Post confirmed that exit bans against Victor and Cynthia had been lifted and the pair had been allowed to return home.

The lifting of exit bans against US citizens in China in 2021 came shortly after an agreement was reached between the United States and the Chinese government relating to the Meng Wanzhou extradition case in which Meng, daughter and CFO of Huawei chief executive Ren Zhengfei was arrested for wire fraud and breach of US sanctions against Iran in December 2018. In 2021, Meng was allowed to reach a deferred prosecution agreement in which she would affirm the accuracy of a statement of facts stating her actions amounted to a breach of US sanctions and fraud and agree not to commit other crimes or face prosecution, allowing her to maintain her initial plea of not guilty. The timing of lifting of exit bans and release of what were effectively hostages raised suspicions in regard to whether a "deal" of sorts had taken place. Whitehouse press secretary Jen Psaki denied claims of a "prisoner swap", stating the Meng Wanzhou case was a "legal matter" overseen by independent prosecutors at the Department of Justice.

American response

In 2015, the Obama administration protested the use of undercover intelligence agents as part of Operation Fox Hunt. In 2020 Federal Bureau of Investigation (FBI) director Christopher A. Wray gave a speech at the Hudson Institute in New York where he talked at length about Fox Hunt and said the purpose of Fox Hunt is political repression, not anti-corruption. According to Wray, targets are given the option of returning to China or committing suicide. Wray also asserted that targets of the operation were coerced into compliance through arrests of family members and friends back home in China who were used as leverage in order to exert psychological pressure against the targets. Wray said “These are not the actions we would expect from a responsible nation-state. Instead, it’s more like something we’d expect from an organised criminal syndicate.”

In September 2020, the FBI arrested NYPD officer Baimadajie Angwang, who had infiltrated the Tibetan community.

In October 2020, five people were arrested by the FBI in relation to their participation in Operation Fox Hunt and charged with conspiring to act as illegal agents of the People's Republic of China (PRC) and conspiracy to commit interstate and international stalking. An additional three people, who are  believed to have absconded to China, were charged with similar offenses.

In July 2021, a federal grand jury indicted nine individuals for acting and conspiring to act in the United States as illegal agents of the PRC and engaging and conspiring to engage in interstate and international stalking. Two of those nine were also charged with obstruction of justice and conspiracy to obstruct justice. Six of the nine had previously been indicted in the October 2020 case and in a May 2021 indictment; the July 2021 indictment is superseding (taking the role of the previous indictment). The individuals are alleged to have surveilled, harassed, stalked, and coerced American residents to return to China, sometimes threatening family members if they failed to comply. The Justice Department accuses Tu Lan, a prosecutor of the Hanyang People's Procuratorate and one of the indicted, of directing the surveillance campaign and subsequent destruction of evidence to obstruct the American investigation into their activities. One of those targeted by the alleged conspirators is accused of having accepted bribes as a Chinese official.

In July 2022, a federal grand jury indicted a Chinese national Sun Hoi Ying (aka Sun Haiying) and a current Department of Homeland Security agent for acting as an agent of the Chinese government. The Department of Justice accused the two of engaging in transnational repression of US based dissidents to "silence, harass, discredit and spy on U.S -based residents for exercising their freedom of speech" In a superseding indictment unsealed on July 7, a grand jury charged Craig Miller, a current DHS agent, and former DHS agent Derrick Taylor, for destroying evidence and allegedly accessing confidential government databases to secure information in aid of repression of local dissidents.

In October 2022, the Justice Department unsealed charges concerning seven Chinese nationals, indicting them in an investigation related to Fox Hunt. Two were arrested in New York. The Chinese nationals were charged for surveillance and harassment in a campaign to coerce a US resident to repatriate to China.

See also
Anti-corruption campaign under Xi Jinping
Chinese intelligence activity abroad
Chinese information operations and information warfare
Chinese police overseas service stations
Extraterritorial operation
Hong Kong national security law
Human rights in China
Political offences in China

References 

Corruption in China
Espionage in China
Espionage in the United States
Chinese diaspora
Political repression in China
Extraterritorial jurisdiction
Ministry of Public Security (China)